Hukok is a kibbutz in Israel. Located near the Sea of Galilee and the cities of Tiberias and Safed, it falls under the jurisdiction of Emek HaYarden Regional Council.

History

In 1945, the Hukok fortress was built by Solel Boneh as a strategic settlement post and named after a biblical village (Joshua 19:34) in the north of Israel.  After the 1948 war, the fortress was used as an absorption center for new immigrants.
  
The kibbutz was established in 1946 by graduates of the Mikveh Israel agricultural school and members of the HaNoar HaOved VeHaLomed youth movement. It was near the Palestinian village of Yaquq and the site of the ancient village of Huqoq which was the supposed burial place of the prophet Habakkuk. Yaquq was later depopulated in 1948.

Between 2002–2003, as part of a nationwide program, the kibbutz took in 76 immigrants (22 families) from Latin America, of whom  58 remained.

Economy
In addition to agriculture, the kibbutz runs a plastics factory, Hukok Industries. The kibbutz operates a private beach on Lake Kinneret that  was awarded a Blue Flag for environmental excellence in 2013.

Notable people
 Tuvia Katz

References

External links

 OR Movement web site Retrieved on 24  May 2009

Kibbutzim
Kibbutz Movement
Populated places established in 1945
Populated places in Northern District (Israel)
1945 establishments in Mandatory Palestine
Sea of Galilee